Thierry Beccaro (born 19 October 1956) is a French stage actor and TV presenter, with an Italian grandfather and Breton origin from his grandmother. He has a sister, younger by four years. He was primarily known to the general public as the presenter of TV game Motus on France 2  (1990-2019) .

Radio career
He began his radio career in 1978 as an assistant to Macha Béranger at Radio France in the copyright department. In 1981, he became a reporter for Radio Bleue, and then hosted his first radio show Grand-mère et boule de gomme. In 1983, he presented the morning and early afternoon programs on Radio France and on France Inter.

TV career
 In 1983, on TF1 he presented La Une est à vous.
 In 1987, he moved to Antenne 2 with the show Matin Bonheur.
 In January 1990, he hosted Après-midi show.
 On 25 June 1990, the game Motus was launched on France 2.
 He hosted other games such as Dingbats (1992) and Jeux de comédie (1996).
 He presented the show Le Grand Zapping de l'humour, broadcast on the weekend on France 2.
 He led 40 ° à l'ombre on France 3.
 He hosted several prime-time shows : La nuit des rigolos, co-presented by Valérie Maurice (1993), Parlez-moi d'amour (2000) and Y a quoi à la télé (November 14, 1998).
 He took part in various shows including Surprise sur prise or Telethon (December 2006, with Frédéric Courant and Jamy Gourmaud, hosts of the program C'est pas sorcier).
 Thierry Beccaro often replaces William Leymergie on Télématin during his vacations.
 Finally, he co-presented Le grand code du savoir vivre with Sandrine Quétier.
 He hosted a new game called Slam on France 2.
 In 2019, he leaves the game Motus and France Televisions.

Theater career
 1993 : Boeing-boeing by Marc Camoletti, Théâtre Michel
 1997 : Voyage de noces by Marc Camoletti, Théâtre Michel
 2010 : Coach by Julie Carcuac, Théâtre Saint Georges

References

1956 births
Living people
French people of Italian descent
French radio presenters
French television presenters
French game show hosts
People from Saint-Mandé